Mathieu of Boulogne, or Matheolus, was a 13th-century French cleric and poet. He is the author of the Liber lamentationum Matheoluli (The Lamentations of Matheolus) (ca. 1295) a work arguing that marriage makes men's lives miserable. The Book of the City of Ladies by Christine de Pizan was primarily written in response to the Lamentations.

External links
http://www.theabsolute.net/misogyny/matheol.html

French poets
13th-century French writers
French male poets
13th-century Latin writers
13th-century French poets